Hydrotherapy, formerly called hydropathy and also called water cure, is a branch of alternative medicine (particularly naturopathy), occupational therapy, and physiotherapy, that involves the use of water for pain relief and treatment. The term encompasses a broad range of approaches and therapeutic methods that take advantage of the physical properties of water, such as temperature and pressure, to stimulate blood circulation, and treat the symptoms of certain diseases.

Various therapies used in the present-day hydrotherapy employ water jets, underwater massage and mineral baths (e.g. balneotherapy, Iodine-Grine therapy, Kneipp treatments, Scotch hose, Swiss shower, thalassotherapy) or whirlpool bath, hot Roman bath, hot tub, Jacuzzi, and cold plunge.

Uses

Water therapy may be restricted to use as aquatic therapy, a form of physical therapy, and as a cleansing agent. However, it is also used as a medium for delivery of heat and cold to the body, which has long been the basis for its application. Hydrotherapy involves a range of methods and techniques, many of which use water as a medium to facilitate thermoregulatory reactions for therapeutic benefit.

Hydrotherapy is used as an adjunct to therapy, including in nursing, where its use is now long established. It continues to be widely used for burn treatment, although shower-based hydrotherapy techniques have been increasingly used in preference to full-immersion methods, partly for the ease of cleaning the equipment and reducing infections due to contamination. When removal of tissue is necessary for the treatment of wounds, hydrotherapy which performs selective mechanical debridement can be used. Examples of this include directed wound irrigation and therapeutic irrigation with suction.

Technique
The appliances and arrangements by means of which heat and cold are brought to bear are:

 Packings, general and local (i.e. Liniment);
 Hot air and steam baths;
 General baths;
 Treadmills
 Sitz (sitting), spinal, head, and foot baths;
 Bandages or compresses, wet and dry; also;
 Fomentations and poultices, sinapisms, stupes, rubbings, and water potations.

Hydrotherapy which involves submerging all or part of the body in water can involve several types of equipment:
 Full body immersion tanks (a "Hubbard tank" is a large size)
 Arm, hip, and leg whirlpool

Whirling water movement, provided by mechanical pumps, has been used in water tanks since at least the 1940s. Similar technologies have been marketed for recreational use under the terms "hot tub" or "spa".

In some cases, baths with whirlpool water flow are not used to manage wounds, as a whirlpool will not selectively target the tissue to be removed, and can damage all tissue. Whirlpools also create an unwanted risk of bacterial infection, can damage fragile body tissue, and in the case of treating arms and legs, bring risk of complications from edema.

History
The therapeutic use of water has been recorded in ancient Egyptian, Greek and Roman civilizations. Egyptian royalty bathed with essential oils and flowers, while Romans had communal public baths for their citizens. Hippocrates prescribed bathing in spring water for sickness. Other cultures noted for a long history of hydrotherapy include China and Japan, the latter being centred primarily around Japanese hot springs. Many such histories predate the Roman thermae.

Modern revival

Hydrotherapy became more prominent following the growth and development of modern medical practices in the 18th and 19th century. As traditional medical practice became increasingly professional in terms of how doctors operated, it was felt that medical treatment became increasingly less personalized, the development of hydrotherapy was believed to be a more personal form of medical treatment that did not necessarily present to patients the alienating scientific language that modern developments of medical treatment entailed.

1700–1810
Two English works on the medical uses of water were published in the 18th century that inaugurated the new fashion for hydrotherapy. One of these was by Sir John Floyer, a physician of Lichfield, who, struck by the remedial use of certain springs by the neighbouring peasantry, investigated the history of cold bathing and published a book on the subject in 1702. The book ran through six editions within a few years and the translation of this book into German was largely drawn upon by Dr J. S. Hahn of Silesia as the basis for his book called On the Healing Virtues of Cold Water, Inwardly and Outwardly Applied, as Proved by Experience, published in 1738.

The other work was a 1797 publication by Dr James Currie of Liverpool on the use of hot and cold water in the treatment of fever and other illness, with a fourth edition published in 1805, not long before his death. It was also translated into German by Michaelis (1801) and Hegewisch (1807). It was highly popular and first placed the subject on a scientific basis. Hahn's writings had meanwhile created much enthusiasm among his countrymen, societies having been formed everywhere to promote the medicinal and dietetic use of water; and in 1804 Professor E.F.C. Oertel of Anspach republished them and quickened the popular movement by unqualified commendation of water drinking as a remedy for all diseases.

The general idea behind hydropathy during the 1800s was to be able to induce something called a crisis. The thinking was that water invaded any cracks, wounds, or imperfections in the skin, which were filled with impure fluids. Health was considered to be the natural state of the body, and filling these spaces with pure water, would flush the impurities out, which would rise to the surface of the skin, producing pus. The event of this pus emerging was called a crisis, and was achieved through a multitude of methods. These methods included techniques such as sweating, the plunging bath, the half bath, the head bath, the sitting bath, and the douche bath. All of these were ways to gently expose the patient to cold water in different ways.

Vincenz Priessnitz (1799–1851) 
Vincenz Priessnitz was the son of a peasant farmer who, as a young child, observed a wounded deer bathing a wound in a pond near his home. Over the course of several days, he would see this deer return and eventually the wound was healed. Later as a teenager, Priessnitz was attending to a horse cart, when the cart ran him over, breaking three of his ribs. A physician told him that they would never heal. Priessnitz decided to try his own hand at healing himself, and wrapped his wounds with damp bandages. By daily changing his bandages and drinking large quantities of water, after about a year, his broken ribs had been cured. Priessnitz quickly gained fame in his hometown and became the consulted physician.

Later in life, Priessnitz became the head of a hydropathy clinic in Gräfenberg in 1826. He was extremely successful and by 1840, he had 1600 patients in his clinic including many fellow physicians, as well as important political figures such as nobles and prominent military officials. Treatment length at Priessnitz's clinic varied. Much of his theory was about inducing the above-mentioned crisis, which could happen quickly, or could occur after three to four years. In accordance with the simplistic nature of hydropathy, a large part of the treatment was based on living a simple lifestyle. These lifestyle adjustments included dietary changes such as eating only very coarse food, such as jerky and bread, and of course drinking large quantities of water. Priessnitz's treatments also included a great deal of less strenuous exercise, mostly including walking. Ultimately, Priessnitz's clinic was extremely successful, and he gained fame across the western world. His practice even influenced the hydropathy that took root overseas in America.

Sebastian Kneipp (1821–1897) 
Sebastian Kneipp was born in Germany and he considered his own role in hydropathy to be that of continuing Priessnitz's work. Kneipp's own practice of hydropathy was even gentler than the norm. He believed that typical hydropathic practices deployed were "too violent or too frequent" and he expressed concern that such techniques would cause emotional or physical trauma to the patient. Kneipp's practice was more all encompassing than Priessnitz's, and his practice involved not only curing the patients' physical woes, but emotional and mental as well.

Kneipp introduced four additional principles to the therapy: medicinal herbs, massages, balanced nutrition, and "regulative therapy to seek inner balance". Kneipp had a very simple view of an already simple practice. For him, hydropathy's primary goals were strengthening the constitution and removing poisons and toxins in the body. These basic interpretations of how hydropathy worked hinted at his complete lack of medical training. Kneipp did have, however, a very successful medical practice in spite of, perhaps even because of, his lack of medical training. As mentioned above, some patients were beginning to feel uncomfortable with traditional doctors because of the elitism of the medical profession. The new terms and techniques that doctors were using were difficult for the average person to understand. Having no formal training, all of his instructions and published works are described in easy to understand language and would have seemed very appealing to a patient who was displeased with the direction traditional medicine was taking.

A significant factor in the popular revival of hydrotherapy was that it could be practised relatively cheaply at home. The growth of hydrotherapy (or 'hydropathy' to use the name of the time), was thus partly derived from two interacting spheres: "the hydro and the home".

Hydrotherapy as a formal medical tool dates from about 1829 when Vincenz Priessnitz (1799–1851), a farmer of Gräfenberg in Silesia, then part of the Austrian Empire, began his public career in the paternal homestead, extended so as to accommodate the increasing numbers attracted by the fame of his cures.

At Gräfenberg, to which the fame of Priessnitz drew people of every rank and many countries, medical men were conspicuous by their numbers, some being attracted by curiosity, others by the desire of knowledge, but the majority by the hope of cure for ailments which had as yet proved incurable. Many records of experiences at Gräfenberg were published, all more or less favorable to the claims of Priessnitz, and some enthusiastic in their estimate of his genius and penetration.

Spread of hydrotherapy

Captain R. T. Claridge was responsible for introducing and promoting hydropathy in Britain, first in London in 1842, then with lecture tours in Ireland and Scotland in 1843. His 10-week tour in Ireland included Limerick, Cork, Wexford, Dublin and Belfast, over June, July and August 1843, with two subsequent lectures in Glasgow.

Some other Englishmen preceded Claridge to Graefenberg, although not many. One of these was Dr. James Wilson, who himself, along with Dr James Manby Gully, established and operated a water cure establishment at Malvern in 1842. In 1843, Wilson and Gully published a comparison of the efficacy of the water-cure with drug treatments, including accounts of some cases treated at Malvern, combined with a prospectus of their Water Cure Establishment. Then in 1846 Gully published The Water Cure in Chronic Disease, further describing the treatments available at the clinic.

The fame of the water-cure establishment grew, and Gully and Wilson became well-known national figures. Two more clinics were opened at Malvern. Famous patients included Charles Darwin, Charles Dickens, Thomas Carlyle, Florence Nightingale, Lord Tennyson and Samuel Wilberforce. With his fame he also attracted criticism:
Sir Charles Hastings, a physician and founder of the British Medical Association, was a forthright critic of hydropathy, and Gully in particular.

From the 1840s, hydropathics were established across Britain. Initially, many of these were small institutions, catering to at most dozens of patients. By the later nineteenth century the typical hydropathic establishment had evolved into a more substantial undertaking, with thousands of patients treated annually for weeks at a time in a large purpose-built building with lavish facilities – baths, recreation rooms and the like – under the supervision of fully trained and qualified medical practitioners and staff.

In Germany, France and America, and in Malvern, England, hydropathic establishments multiplied with great rapidity. Antagonism ran high between the old practice and the new. Unsparing condemnation was heaped by each on the other; and a legal prosecution, leading to a royal commission of inquiry, served but to make Priessnitz and his system stand higher in public estimation.

Increasing popularity soon diminished caution whether the new method would help minor ailments and be of benefit to the more seriously injured. Hydropathists occupied themselves mainly with studying chronic invalids well able to bear a rigorous regimen and the severities of unrestricted crisis. The need of a radical adaptation to the former class was first adequately recognized by John Smedley, a manufacturer of Derbyshire, who, impressed in his own person with the severities as well as the benefits of the cold water cure, practised among his workpeople a milder form of hydropathy, and began about 1852 a new era in its history, founding at Matlock a counterpart of the establishment at Gräfenberg.

Ernst Brand (1827–1897) of Berlin, Raljen and Theodor von Jürgensen of Kiel, and Karl Liebermeister of Basel, between 1860 and 1870, employed the cooling bath in abdominal typhus with striking results, and led to its introduction to England by Dr Wilson Fox. In the Franco-German War the cooling bath was largely employed, in conjunction frequently with quinine; and it was used in the treatment of hyperpyrexia.

Hot baths

Hydrotherapy, especially as promoted during the height of its Victorian revival, has often been associated with the use of cold water, as evidenced by many titles from that era. However, not all therapists limited their practice of hydrotherapy to cold water, even during the height of this popular revival.

The specific use of heat was however often associated with the Turkish bath. This was introduced by David Urquhart into England on his return from the East in the 1850s, and ardently adopted by Richard Barter. The Turkish bath became a public institution, and, with the morning tub and the general practice of water drinking, is the most noteworthy of the many contributions by hydropathy to public health.

Spread to the United States

The first U.S. hydropathic facilities were established by Joel Shew and Russell Thacher Trall in the 1840s. Dr Charles Munde also established early hydrotherapy facilities in the 1850s. Trall also co-edited the Water Cure Journal.

By 1850, it was said that "there are probably more than one hundred" facilities, along with numerous books and periodicals, including the New York Water Cure Journal, which had "attained an extent of circulation equalled by few monthlies in the world". By 1855, there were attempts by some to weigh the evidence of treatments in vogue at that time.

Following the introduction of hydrotherapy to the U.S., John Harvey Kellogg employed it at Battle Creek Sanitarium, which opened in 1866, where he strove to improve the scientific foundation for hydrotherapy. Other notable hydropathic centers of the era included the Cleveland Water Cure Establishment, founded in 1848, which operated successfully for two decades, before being sold to an organization which transformed it into an orphanage.
At its height, there were over 200 water-cure establishments in the United States, most located in the northeast. Few of these lasted into the postbellum years, although some survived into the 20th century including institutions in Scott (Cortland County), Elmira, Clifton Springs and Dansville. While none were located in Jefferson County, the Oswego Water Cure operated in the city of Oswego.

Subsequent developments
In November 1881, the British Medical Journal noted that hydropathy was a specific instance, or "particular case", of general principles of thermodynamics. That is, "the application of heat and cold in general", as it applies to physiology, mediated by hydropathy. In 1883, another writer stated "Not, be it observed, that hydropathy is a water treatment after all, but that water is the medium for the application of heat and cold to the body".

Hydrotherapy was used to treat people with mental illness in the 19th and 20th centuries and before World War II, various forms of hydrotherapy were used to treat alcoholism. The basic text of the Alcoholics Anonymous fellowship, Alcoholics Anonymous, reports that A.A. co-founder Bill Wilson was treated by hydrotherapy for his alcoholism in the early 1930s.

Recent techniques
A subset of cryotherapy involves cold water immersion or ice baths, used by physical therapists, sports medicine facilities and rehab clinics. Proponents assert that it results in improved return of blood flow and byproducts of cellular breakdown to the lymphatic system and more efficient recycling.

Alternating the temperatures, either in a shower or complementary tanks, combines the use of hot and cold in the same session. Proponents claim improvement in circulatory system and lymphatic drainage. Experimental evidence suggests that contrast hydrotherapy helps to reduce injury in the acute stages by stimulating blood flow and reducing swelling.

Society and culture
The growth of hydrotherapy, and various forms of hydropathic establishments, resulted in a form of tourism, both in the UK, and in Europe. At least one book listed English, Scottish, Irish and European establishments suitable for each specific malady, while another focused primarily on German spas and hydropathic establishments, but including other areas. While many bathing establishments were open all year round, doctors advised patients not to go before May, "nor to remain after October. English visitors rather prefer cold weather, and they often arrive for the baths in May, and return again in September. Americans come during the whole season, but prefer summer. The most fashionable and crowded time is during July and August". In Europe, interest in various forms of hydrotherapy and spa tourism continued unabated through the 19th century and into the 20th century, where "in France, Italy and Germany, several million people spend time each year at a spa." In 1891, when Mark Twain toured Europe and discovered that a bath of spring water at Aix-les-Bains soothed his rheumatism, he described the experience as "so enjoyable that if I hadn't had a disease I would have borrowed one just to have a pretext for going on".

This was not the first time such forms of spa tourism had been popular in Europe and the U.K. Indeed,
in Europe, the application of water in the treatment of fevers and other maladies had, since the seventeenth century, been consistently promoted by a number of medical writers. In the eighteenth century, taking to the waters became a fashionable pastime for the wealthy classes who decamped to resorts around Britain and Europe to cure the ills of over-consumption. In the main, treatment in the heyday of the British spa consisted of sense and sociability: promenading, bathing, and the repetitive quaffing of foul-tasting mineral waters.

A hydropathic establishment is a place where people receive hydropathic treatment. They are commonly built in spa towns, where mineral-rich or hot water occurs naturally.

Several hydropathic institutions wholly transferred their operations away from therapeutic purposes to become tourist hotels in the late 20th century whilst retaining the name 'Hydro'. There are several prominent examples in Scotland at Crieff, Peebles and Seamill amongst others.

Other animals

Canine hydrotherapy is a form of hydrotherapy directed at the treatment of chronic conditions, post-operative recovery, and pre-operative or general fitness in dogs.

See also

 Balneotherapy or "bath therapy"
 Colon cleansing
 Destination spa
 Enema
 Finnish sauna
 Halliwick
 Hot tub
 Mineral spring
 Sebastian Kneipp
 Kneipp facility
 Spa
 Spa bath
 Spa town
 Spotted Lake (Kliluk)
 Steam shower
 Thalassotherapy
 Water aerobics

Notes

a.  While the second sense, of water as a form of torture is documented back to at least the 15th century, the first use of the term water cure as a torture is indirectly dated to around 1898, by U.S. soldiers in the Spanish–American War, after the term had been introduced to America in the mid-19th century in the therapeutic sense, which was in widespread use. Indeed, while the torture sense of water cure was by 1900–1902 established in the American army, with a conscious sense of irony, this sense was not in widespread use. Webster's 1913 dictionary cited only the therapeutic sense, water cure being synonymous with hydropathy, the term by which hydrotherapy was known in the 19th century and early 20th century.

The late 19th century expropriation of the term water cure, already in use in the therapeutic sense, to denote the polar opposite of therapy, namely torture, has the hallmark of arising in the sense of irony. This would be in keeping with some of the reactions to water cure therapy and its promotion, which included not only criticism, but also parody and satire.

References

Further reading

 
Aquatic therapy
Natural environment based therapies
Alternative medical treatments